Mercedes-Benz Truck Racing (abbreviated: MBTR) is a simulation truck racing video game developed by the German company Synetic GmbH and published by THQ. The game was released for Microsoft Windows in 2000. The development was carried out in cooperation with Daimler AG, owner of Mercedes-Benz.

Later, in 2003, Synetic GmbH developed another game focused on Mercedes-Benz cars - Mercedes-Benz World Racing. That game uses a significantly improved version of the game engine on which Mercedes-Benz Truck Racing is based.

Gameplay 

Mercedes-Benz Truck Racing is a racing simulator that revolved around licensed racing trucks of the Mercedes-Benz brand. When developing the game, special attention was paid to the correct physical model of cars and the damage system; vehicles are modeled from real prototypes.

Passing various racing stages in the championship unlocks previously inaccessible trucks. The tracks are based on real racetracks.

The player vehicle is controlled using the keyboard and a racing wheel is supported.

Reception 

The game was highly praised by the specialized press. For example, French publications JeuxVideoPC.com and Jeuxvideo.com have rated the game 75% out of 100%, respectively; a lower score for the game (6/10) was rated by the website Gamekult.

Mercedes-Benz Truck Racing received an 80% rating from German magazines PC Games Germany and PC Player Germany. According to MobyRank's ratings, the highest scores - 86% and 88% - were given to the game by GameStar and Gamesmania.

On the well-known Russian gaming site Absolute Games, Mercedes-Benz Truck Racing has received 85% out of 100%. The author of the review notes the high-quality 3D graphics, realistic physical model and interesting gameplay ("in terms of gaming interest, MBTR is able to satisfy the needs of the most discerning public"). The verdict was summed up with the words: "Grab it, play it, go crazy. With the complete absence of competition, the guys from Synetic have proved that there is only one warrior in the field."

The average score according to the MobyRank rating is 79% out of 100%.

See also 
 Mercedes-Benz World Racing
 Super Trucks Racing 2

Notes

References

Links 
 
 
 
 
 

Truck racing video games
THQ games
Multiplayer and single-player video games
Windows games
Video games developed in Germany
Windows-only games
2000 video games